Dexopollenia trifascia is a species of cluster fly in the family Polleniidae.

Distribution
Indonesia.

References

Polleniidae
Insects described in 1861
Diptera of Asia